The Corporación Oaxaqueña de Radio y Televisión (CORTV, "Oaxacan Radio and Television Corporation") is a government agency of the Mexican state of Oaxaca charged with the operation of radio and television stations in the state.

CORTV operates a television network of the same name, with 16 transmitters, and it owns a 32-station FM radio network with an additional station in Oaxaca. The television network has shed 30 transmitters in recent years and also dropped six additional transmitters by failing to convert them to digital.

History
Public broadcasting in Oaxaca began in the early 1980s under Governor Pedro Vásquez Colmenares, with the insertion of local opt-outs into the programming of the Canal 7 network of Imevisión. Original output consisted entirely of plays staged for television by the Compañía Teatral Palo Bravo, as the state lacked production resources. In 1988, the Instituto Oaxaqueño de Radio y Televisión (IORTV) was established.

On March 21, 1989, under the direction of Virgilio Caballero Pedraza, IORTV was reorganized as Radio y Televisión de Oaxaca (RTO). It adopted its present name in 1993.

Television transmitters
CORTV holds virtual channel 9 throughout Oaxaca. In 2022, its concessions for television service were consolidated into one: XHCPBR-TDT (primary RF channel 36), which can have transmitters throughout the state. However, the existing transmitters were not moved to channel 36.

|-

|-

|-

|-

|-

|-

|-

|-

|-

|-

|-

|-

|-

|-

|-

|}

In March 2018, in order to facilitate the repacking of TV services out of the 600 MHz band (channels 38-51), the transmitters for Juchitán de Zaragoza and Pinotepa Nacional were assigned new channels for continued digital operations.

Radio transmitters
Note that XHOAX-FM "Global 96.9" broadcasts different programming from the other 32 stations in the network. XHCRR on Cerro Corral de Piedra is receivable in the city of Oaxaca.

The CORTV transmitters serving Oaxaca (XHOAX and XHCRR) broadcast in HD Radio.

References

Public television in Mexico
Television stations in Oaxaca
Mass media in Oaxaca City
Public radio in Mexico